Bala Devi Chandrashekar is a Bharatanatyam dancer and teacher based in Princeton, New Jersey, United States.  She was trained under Dr. Padma Subrahmanyam. Bala Devi Chandrashekar is a Professor of practice in Asian performing arts. Her approach is interdisciplinary, involving lecturing and research. Bala Devi's unique well researched productions include Nandanar Charithram, Krishnaarpnam and Uddhava Gita.

Career
Bala Devi Chandrashekar is the artistic director of the New Jersey Bharatanatyam school Shree Padma Nrityam Academy of performing Arts Inc., with head office in Princeton, New Jersey. The school provides Bharatanatyam classes to aspiring dancers and also serves as a facilitator for cultural preservation, presentation, and exchange of ideas for South Asian Performing Arts with a primary focus on Indian classical dance - Bharatanatyam.
Bala works as a Bharatanatyam teacher, lecturer & researcher and a performer. She is a performing soloist and has developed her own dance technique, and currently she works on number of projects on Performing Arts, raising the awareness of Bharatanatyam in New Jersey and the relationship  to other performing arts. Bala works on the study of movement technique investigating the relationship of the archive and the repertoire, from an interdisciplinary domain; Dance technique, Cultural Perspectives of South Asia, Music, Literature, Art History and Dance Anthropology.

Bala has performed in many prestigious venues in North America, Europe, Middle East and India. As a Professor of Practice & Artistic Director of SPNAPA Academy of Performing Arts, Princeton, New Jersey, she imparts valuable knowledge to her many dedicated students. Bala constantly works on developing and perfecting the style that would be seamless and fluid while yet retaining the precision, power and purity of line -typical of classical dance. As a Professor of Practice, Bala is constantly developing curriculum in "Performing studies" in collaboration with Theater and Dance, History, Philosophy, Linguistic anthropology and South Asian Departments of various universities in the United States. She has served as a Fellow and Artist - in - Residence at The Carl A. Fields Center at Princeton University. Bala Devi has given lectures and taught courses on Bharatanatyam in Mount Holyoke, Princeton, Columbia university, University of Pennsylvania, Yeshiva University, Vassar College, Rutgers University, New Jersey. Rider University New Jersey.

Bala's focus on lecture and research blends seamlessly with her  concert platform. Her lectures incorporate the core architectural  components of ancient temple sculptures – Karanas, governed by artistic laws of value bridging disciplines together and reducing the hazy scope. She has participated in numerous lectures, intercultural, religious and performing arts events as a faculty, consultant and mentor and is the recipient of several prestigious grants from several state and private foundations including the NJ Humanities council, Texas commission on the Arts and Ohio State Council on the Arts.

Recognition
 Conferred with the Kalaimamani award by the Tamil Nadu Government on 13 August 2019 </https://indianexpress.com/article/cities/chennai/tamil-nadu-kalaimamani-awards-full-list-of-winners-5908219/>
 Conferred with Rotary Lifetime achievement award at the Music Academy, Chennai on 11 November 2016. 
 Conferred with the title "Bharata Nritya Seva Mani" by her teacher, Dr. Padma Subrahmanyam, for her dedicated services in promoting art and culture.
 Grant Awards from the New Jersey State Arts Council. 
 Recognized by the National Foundation for Advancement in the Arts for coaching students in exceptional artistic achievements.
 Natya Kala Bharathi, Thanjavur, Tamil Nadu
 Nritya Seva Mani - Cleveland Aradhana, USA
 Vocational Excellence award - Rotary club of Trichy, Tamil Nadu
 Bharata Nritya Seva Mani - Nrithyodaya, Chennai, Tamil Nadu
 New Jersey State Government, Proclamation for contribution to Bharatanatyam in New Jersey
 Contribution to performing Arts New York City Coறncil Citation for contribution to Arts
 Princeton University, New Jersey appreciation for contribution to Arts, USA
 Villanova University appreciation for contribution to Arts, USA
 Rutgers University, New Jersey appreciation certificate for contribution to Arts, USA

Acclaimed performances
Key productions include Nandanar Charithram, MLV Favorites- A traditional Margam based on songs popularized by legendary Carnatic music singer M L Vasanthakumari,  Krishnaarpan - A Margam based on the Life of Lord Krishna. In the year 2013, she presented Uddhava Gita
- Lord Krishna's last message. This was the first time Uddhava Gita was presented in Bharatanatyam format. Uddhava Gita was premiered at Bharatiya Vidya Bhavan London, England. The same production was successfully presented at the Chennai Dance festival in month December 2012. In the year 2013, Bala also presented Vishwam - The Omnipresent. Based on the sacred Hindu text Bhagavatham - The production had references to Lord Krishna's life, King Mahabali, and the unique story of Sage Markandaya. Bala Devi has staged nine productions to date. Presented Vishwam - The Omnipresent at John Witherspoon Middle School, New Jersey as a part of a fundraiser for a New Jersey-based arts organization  on 16 May 2014. With the guidance of TN Ramachandran and Dr. Kodavayul Balasubramanian Bala Devi produced "Brihadeesawara - form to formless".. This production was staged at the UNESCO head office in Paris.

Positions
Served as a Honorary Board member for New Jersey Governor school, New Jersey, USA.

Served as an Artist in residence - Princeton University, Princeton, USA

Advisor - Sangam Festival, New Jersey

Philanthropy
Bala Devi Chandrashekar ancestors belong to Kodavasal, Manjakudi of Thanjavur District, Tamil Nadu. She is actively involved in village of Umayalpuram, by maintaining a very old Sri Rama temple in Umayalpuram with visits and performances every year.

Publications
"Indian Classical Dances as a Cultural Communication" – AACC Department of Dance – Mason Gross School of Performing Arts,  Rutgers University & NJ Council for the Humanities. 
"Revival of Margi – The need of the hour" -The 2004 Barbara Stoler  Miller Conference – Contesting Pasts, Performing Futures: Nationalism, globalization and the Performing Arts in Modern South. 
Asia – Barnard College and Columbia University in the City of New York.
"Arts in Community Life" – Lotus Music and Dance & Mid Atlantic  Arts Foundation Artists and community's collaboration.
"The under-current of Margi in today’s Desis" - Mount Holyoke  College Fall 2004, sponsored by Dept. of Asian Studies in connection with the course on classical Indian literature and aesthetics. 
"Experiencing the Cosmic energy through dance and movement -  Barnard College" – Columbia University.

See also
 Indians in the New York City metropolitan area

References

External links
[2]
Times of India
Thehindu.com
Thehindu.com
Shreepadmanrityam.org
Thehindu.com
Mccc.edu
www.sangamfestival.org

^

Year of birth missing (living people)
Living people
Bharatanatyam exponents
Indian dance teachers
Performers of Indian classical dance
Teachers of Indian classical dance